The Archaeological Survey of India lists a number of ancient monuments within the Thrissur Circle, Tamil Nadu in India. 10 Monuments of National Importance have been recognized by the ASI in Thrissur circle of Tamil Nadu.

List of monuments 

|}

See also 
 List of Monuments of National Importance in Chennai circle
 List of Monuments of National Importance in Kanchipuram district
 List of Monuments of National Importance in Pudukkottai district
 List of Monuments of National Importance in India for other Monuments of National Importance in India
 List of State Protected Monuments in Tamil Nadu

References

Tamil Nadu